Anirban Chatterjee (born 2 December 1982) is an Indian former cricketer. He played thirteen List A matches for Bengal between 2004 and 2005.

See also
 List of Bengal cricketers

References

External links
 

1982 births
Living people
Indian cricketers
Bengal cricketers
Cricketers from Kolkata